The Journey is a 1986 Swiss-German drama film  written and directed by Markus Imhoof.
 
The film was entered into the main competition at the 43rd edition of the Venice Film Festival.

Plot

Cast 
Markus Boysen as Bertram Voss (based on Bernward Vesper)
  Corinna Kirchhoff as Dagmar Wegener (based on Gudrun Ensslin)
 Will Quadflieg as Vater Jost Voss (based on Will Vesper)
  Christa Berndl as  Mutter Voss
  Alexander Mehner as  Florian
  Claude Oliver Rudolph as  Rolf Schröder (based on Andreas Baader)
  Gero Prenn as  Bertram als Kind

References

External links

1986 drama films
1986 films
Swiss drama films
German drama films
West German films
Films directed by Markus Imhoof
Films set in the 1960s
Films set in the 1970s
Films set in West Germany
Cultural depictions of the Red Army Faction
Films based on German novels
Films based on biographies
Films à clef
1980s German-language films
1980s German films